The Legend of King Naresuan: The Series Or King Naresuan The Series (English name in Thailand) is a period drama Thai television series adaptation of the biographical film series of the same name, which chronicles King Naresuan the Great, who ruled the Ayutthaya Kingdom from 1590 until his death in 1605.

The series is directed by Chalermchatri Yukol, the son of the films' director. Unlike the movie, the series features new actors but Sorapong Chatree who portrayed Mahathera Kun Chong in the film.

Plot
The whole series itself is a TV series adaptation of the biographical film of the same name.

The first season deals with Naresuan's boyhood, when he was taken hostage by Burmese King Bayinnaung to keep the rebellious Ayutthaya Kingdom as a vassal state. During this time, he was a novice Buddhist monk under the tutelage of a wise father-figure monk (Sorapong Chatree).

The second season focuses on Naresuan as a young and formidable military strategist who leads his army on a series of campaigns against breakaway kingdoms for King Bayinnaung's successor, Nanda Bayin, until he eventually revolts to free Siam.

The third and final season depicts Naresuan's leadership of the Ayutthaya kingdom and his fight against the Toungoo Empire.

Cast
 Panukorn Wongbunmak as Prince Naresuan (Young)
 Nutchanont Bunsiri as Prince Naresuan (teenager - Show in season 1 only)
 Daweerit Chullasapya as Prince Naresuan (Teenager - show in season 2 onwards)
 Pattarakorn Prasertset as Minchit Sra (Young)
 Korapat Kirdpan as Prince Prince Minchit Sra (teenager) (teenager - Show in season 1 only)
 Aungoont Thanasapchroen as Prince Maha Upraja Minchit Sra (teenager) (teenager - Show in season 2 onwards)
 Nuanchan Na Thalang as Manechan (young - Show in season 1 only)
 Napapach Thitakawin as Manechan (teenager - Show in season 1 only)
 Pacharawan Vadrukchit as Manechan (teenager - Show in season 2 onwards)
 NongBiw Khaokong as Saming
 Sitthochok Puerkpoonpol as Rachamanu (Bunting) - Teenager (show in season 1 only)
 Rachan Sharma as Rachamanu (Bunting) - teenager (show in season 2 onwards)
 Atiwat Snitwong Na Ayutthaya as  King Maha Thamaracha Thirat
 Pacharanamon Nonthapa as Princess Supankulaya (show in season 1-3)
 Pattharawadee Laosa as Princess Wilaikalaya
 Paramej Noi-Um as King Bayinnaung
 Kasarb Jumpadib as King Nanda Bayin
 Sorapong Chatree as Mahathera Khanchong
 Lervith Sangsit as King Mahinthrathirat
 Sukol Sasijullaka as King MahaChakrapadi
 Rushanont Rearnpetch as Prince Ekathotsarot (teenager - show in season 1 only)
 Pitchawut Piemthammaroj as Prince Ekathotsarot (teenager - Show in season 2 only)
 Siraprapha Sukdumrong as Queen Wisutkasat
 Nussara Prawanna as Queen Meng Pyu
 Jirawath Wachirasarunpach as Lord Tala
 Tanayong Wongtrakul as Lord Luckwaitummoo

References

External links
 The Legend of King Naresuan: The Series (season 1) all episode
 The Legend of King Naresuan: The Series (season 2) all episode
 
 
 

Television series by Mono29
Thai historical television series
Cultural depictions of Thai monarchs
History of Thailand in fiction